Maggie Oliver can mean:

 Maggie Oliver (actor) (1844–1892), Australian actress and comedian
 Maggie Toulouse Oliver (born c. 1976), American politician
 Margaret Oliver, former British police officer and whistleblower